Lorraine Marie Tianco Badoy-Partosa, also called Lorraine Badoy and sometimes Lorraine Partosa, is a Filipino physician, government official, and political figure best known for having been one of the spokespersons of the National Task Force to End Local Communist Armed Conflict, and for being involved in various controversies relating to the practice of Red-tagging in the Philippines.

Badoy-Partosa was also Undersecretary of the Presidential Communications Operations Office (PCOO) and Assistant Secretary of the Department of Social Welfare and Development. She is the half-sister of advocacy leader and educator Gang Badoy and the niece of former Cotabato City Mayor Ludovico Badoy.

Prior to her appointment to government, Badoy-Partosa was known for being an avid supporter of President Rodrigo Duterte during his campaign.

References 

Filipino medical doctors
Duterte administration personnel
Living people
Year of birth missing (living people)